Ann Parker (born 1934) is an American artist and photographer. Her work is included in the collections of the Whitney Museum of American Art, the Metropolitan Museum of Art and the Getty Museum Los Angeles.

References

1934 births
Living people
20th-century photographers
American photographers
20th-century American women photographers
20th-century American photographers
21st-century American women